The NEC Native Education College is a registered private aboriginal college based in Vancouver, British Columbia. It is governed by non-profit society and is a registered charitable organization.

Partnerships
NEC is a member of the Indigenous Adult and Higher Learning Association (IAHLA), which was created in 2003 to represent and work on behalf of Aboriginal controlled adult and post-secondary education institutes in British Columbia.

Programs and courses
Programs and courses offered include:

 Aboriginal Adult Basic Education
 Health Care Assistant
 Aboriginal Tourism Operations
 Aboriginal Tourism Management
 Family and Community Counselling
 Early Childhood Education
 Aboriginal Justice Studies
 Applied Business Technology
 Northwest Coast Jewellery Arts

History
Although NEC (formerly Native Education Centre) had existed since 1967, it was in 1979 that the society was formed to assume control and broaden the scope of education to include academic post-secondary courses. The school moved into its current facilities in 1985, a building featuring architectural features of a traditional Pacific Coast longhouse.

The Board of Directors of NEC Native Education Society made the decision to cease operations of NEC Native Education College effective July 31, 2007. This decision was overturned in late July with support of the Ministry of Advanced Education to develop a new funding formula for private Aboriginal colleges in late 2007.

References

Further reading
 Mirehouse, V. Grace. "The Native Education Centre: its impact on cultural identity and educational outcomes." Master of Arts, University of British Columbia.

External links
 

Educational institutions established in 1967
1967 establishments in British Columbia
First Nations education
Indigenous universities and colleges in North America
Universities and colleges in Vancouver
Colleges in British Columbia